Elitzur Givat Shmuel is a basketball club, originally from Giv'at Shmuel in Israel. The club plays in the Liga Artzit, the third division of Israeli basketball. It played in the Israeli Basketball Premier League as recently as the 2008–2009 season.

The home hall of the club was the Leader Arena (1,400 seats) in Ganei Tikva.

Notable players
- Set a club record or won an individual award as a professional player.
- Played at least one official international match for his senior national team at any time.
  Dror Cohen
  Doron Brookhim
 Shimon Amsalem
David Bernsley (born 1969), American-Israeli basketball player

See also
:Category:Maccabi Givat Shmuel players

References

Maccabi basketball clubs
Basketball teams in Israel